Marie Nimier is a French writer. She was born in Paris in 1957. Her father was the writer Roger Nimier (1925-1962) who was a key figure in the Hussards movement that opposed the French existentialists led by Sartre. She has published numerous books, and her works have been translated in the major European languages. She won the Prix Médicis in 2004 for La Reine du silence, in which she evoked her relationship with her father. She is also a playwright and songwriter.

References

21st-century French writers
Writers from Paris
Prix Médicis winners
1957 births
Living people